Tamara Moss (born 9 October 1987) is an Indian supermodel.

Career
Moss has done cover shots for L'Officiel, Elle, and Femina, and modelled for the Kingfisher Calendar. She was the new face for the Provogue Women's Wear Spring Summer ‘09 collection.

References

External links
Fashion Model Directory Profile

Living people
Indian female models
1987 births